Karina Borisovna Aznavourian (born 20 September 1974 in Baku) is a Russian épée fencer. She won two gold medals in the team épée event at the 2000 and 2004 Summer Olympics. Also won bronze medal at the 1996 Summer Olympics.

Biography 
Aznavourian was born in Baku in an Armenian-Azerbaijani family.  In 1990, she and her family moved to Moscow.

Having changed the type of weapon from the rapier to the Épée, she began to train under the guidance of Alexander Kislyunin.

She graduated from the Olympic Reserve School No. 3, then graduated from the Russian State University of Physical Education, Sport, Youth and Tourism.

In 1996, as part of the Russian national team became the bronze medalist at the Olympic Games in Atlanta. In 1997, she won the silver medals of the 19th Universiade, both in team and individual competitions. Later in the Russian team won the Olympic Games in Sydney (2000) and Athens (2004), then she won the World Championships in 2003 and Europe Championships in 2004.

After completing her sports career in 2008, she headed the junior sports school of the Moscow Secondary Special School of Olympic Reserve No. 3, and in August 2012, she was appointed as a director of this school.

Awards 
 Order of Honour (24 August 2005)
 Order of Friendship (19 April 2001)
 Medal of the Order "For Merit to the Fatherland" (6 January 1996)

References

External links
 
  (archive)
   (in English)
 
 

1974 births
Living people
Sportspeople from Baku
Azerbaijani people of Armenian descent
Azerbaijani emigrants to Russia
Russian people of Armenian descent
Russian sportspeople of Armenian descent
Russian sportspeople of Azerbaijani descent
Russian female épée fencers
Fencers at the 1996 Summer Olympics
Fencers at the 2000 Summer Olympics
Fencers at the 2004 Summer Olympics
Olympic fencers of Russia
Olympic gold medalists for Russia
Olympic bronze medalists for Russia
Olympic medalists in fencing
Medalists at the 1996 Summer Olympics
Medalists at the 2000 Summer Olympics
Medalists at the 2004 Summer Olympics
Universiade medalists in fencing
Universiade silver medalists for Russia
Medalists at the 1997 Summer Universiade